Glen Garvie James David Buick (born 1937) is a Canadian former diplomat. He was Ambassador Extraordinary and Plenipotentiary to Chile.

References

External links 
 Foreign Affairs and International Trade Canada Complete List of Posts 

1937 births
Living people
People from Saskatchewan
Ambassadors of Canada to Chile